Achariaceae is a family of flowering plants consisting of 32-33 genera with about 155 species of tropical herbs, shrubs, and trees. The APG IV system has greatly expanded the scope of the family by including many genera previously classified in Flacourtiaceae. Molecular data strongly support the inclusion of this family in the order Malpighiales.

The family is almost exclusively tropical and is best known as the source of chaulmoogra oil, formerly used to treat leprosy. Unlike other members of the former Flacourtiaceae now placed in the family Salicaceae, the genera of Achariaceae typically have cyanogenic glycosides.

Genera

References

 
Malpighiales families